A Lady Without Passport is a 1950 American film noir film directed by Joseph H. Lewis and starring Hedy Lamarr and John Hodiak. Written by Howard Dimsdale, the film is about a beautiful concentration-camp refugee who has taken up residence in Cuba while awaiting permission to enter the United States. An undercover immigration agent decides to use her as an informant to entrap the leader of an alien-smuggling ring.

This film marked the feature film debut of actor Steven Hill.

Plot
After World War II, immigrants in Cuba who are refused visas for various reasons try to sneak into the U.S. illegally with the help of a human smuggling ring run by Palinov (George Macready), a Levantine café owner. Following the death of one immigrant, U.S. Immigration operative Pete Karczag (John Hodiak) is sent to Havana, where he poses as a Hungarian in need of Palinov's services. During his dangerous undercover investigation, Pete meets Marianne Lorress (Hedy Lamarr), a penniless Austrian refugee of the Buchenwald concentration camp who is waiting to be smuggled into the United States by Palinov. He decides to use her to obtain the place and time of Palinov's next operation.

However Pete falls in love with Marianne, and deducing that she must give herself to Palinov in trade for the trip, talks her into staying in Cuba. Palinov discovers Karczag's true purpose and decides to use his own services. He exposes Pete to Marianne, who angrily decides to go ahead with the smuggling trip. Palinov tries to have Pete killed but the agent overcomes his would-be killer, gets the information from him, and reports it to his superior, Frank Westlake (James Craig). Palinov flies to the United States with Marianne and the other smuggled passengers. However, the airplane is being tracked by U.S. Immigration and is unable to refuel in Florida. Palinov and his pilot crash-land in the Florida Everglades in a desperate attempt to elude capture.

Palinov forces Marianne to accompany him and his pilot, seeking a boat hidden on a river. He kills one of the passengers trying to board their small raft; the rest flee into the glades. Pete and Westlake take up pursuit but split up when Westlake decides that saving the lives of the remaining immigrants takes priority over arresting Palinov. Pete continues after the fugitives and Marianne. The pilot is bitten by a poisonous snake and is left behind. Pete finds the hidden boat and gives it to Palinov in exchange for Marianne, although Palinov treacherously tries but fails to shoot them during his escape. Pete reassures her that Palinov won't get far—Pete emptied the boat's fuel tank before giving it up.

Cast
 Hedy Lamarr as Marianne Lorress
 John Hodiak as Peter Karczag
 James Craig as Frank Westlake
 George Macready as Palinov
 Steven Geray as Frenchman
 Bruce Cowling as Archer Delby James
 Nedrick Young as Harry Nordell
 Steven Hill as Jack
 Robert Osterloh as Lt. Lannahan
 Trevor Bardette as Lt. Carfagno
 Charles Wagenheim as Ramon Santez
 Renzo Cesana as A. Sestina
 Esther Zeitlin as Beryl Sandring
 Carlo Tricoli as Mr. Sandring
 Marta Mitrovich as Elizaveth Alonescu
 Don Garner as Dmitri Matthias
 Richard Crane as Navy Flyer
 Nita Bieber as Dancer

Production
The working title of this film was Visa and the production dates were early January through late February 1950.

Reception

According to MGM records the film earned $668,000 in the US and Canada and $336,000 elsewhere, leading to a loss of $444,000.

Critical response
Despite the fact that the film was made on a small budget, most reviews find the Casablanca-like film entertaining.

When the film was released, the staff at Variety praised the film, writing "Beginning is a bit too cryptic for quick understanding, but when plotline [adapted by Cyril Hume from a suggested story by Lawrence Taylor] does take shape, the story builds and holds attention. Joseph H. Lewis' direction spins it along expertly, neatly pacing the suspenseful sequences."

In the 21st century, Time Out Film Guide praised director Lewis. "A tight little script and economically etched characters provide a strong foundation, but it is Lewis' evocative visuals that really turn this into a poverty row gem."

In 2003, Dennis Schwartz gave the film a mixed review, writing: "Joseph H. Lewis (Gun Crazy/The Big Combo) does his best to make this tightly but uninspiring clichéd film noir work. But even though he adds zest and style by his solid visual directing effort, this low-budget Casablanca wannabe still lacks force. Though this is one of the much praised poverty row director's poorer films, it still is an interesting watch due to the strange effects of the visuals and the surreal atmospheric location shots."

Music
The dramatic score for the film, an ethnic Caribbean motif, was composed by David Raksin and conducted by Johnny Green.

A suite of Raksin's music that survives on the film's master tape was issued on CD in 2009 on Film Score Monthly records.

References

External links

 
 
 
 

1950 films
1950 crime drama films
American black-and-white films
1950s English-language films
Film noir
Films based on short fiction
Films directed by Joseph H. Lewis
Films scored by David Raksin
Metro-Goldwyn-Mayer films
Films set in Havana
Films set in Florida
American crime drama films
Films about illegal immigration to the United States
1950s American films